Stoeger Industries is a manufacturer and importer of firearms into the United States.

The company's Stoeger Publishing division also publishes books and videos about firearms, hunting and fishing.

Stoeger Industries' headquarters are in Accokeek, Maryland, United States. Stoeger is a wholly owned subsidiary of Benelli USA, which in turn is owned by Italian firearms conglomerate Beretta Holding S.A. Besides marketing a line of tactical and hunting shotguns as well as air rifles, Stoeger also serves as an FFL for importing firearms by Uberti, also a member of the Benelli/Beretta group.

Because of the significant corporate interrelationships, the actual country of manufacturing origin of Stoeger firearms varies based on both the specific model and the year of its manufacture.  Current Stoeger firearms have their manufacturing origins in countries such as Brazil, Italy, Turkey, and the United States.

History
Prior to its acquisition by Beretta in 2000, Stoeger was located in New Jersey, and prior to that was the largest gun store in New York City.

Stoeger commissioned various small companies in Germany to manufacture a .22 Long Rifle replica of the Luger, which it imported.  It later sold an American-made version of the Luger in 1994. The pistol was all stainless steel and was in 9 mm and sold as the American Eagle Luger with 4" and 6" barrels. Stoeger has owned the name "Luger" in the United States market since around 1924.

Stoeger also distributed in the United States some firearms made by Fabrique Nationale (FN).

Firearms / Airguns
Firearms and airguns sold by Stoeger Industries include the following:
.22 Luger
Stoeger STR 9 - 9mm Pistol
Stoeger XP4 Single shot pre-compressed air pistol (360 m/s muzzle velocity 0.177 pellets)
X5 Spring piston entry level air rifle (200 m/s muzzle velocity 0.22 pellets / 245 m/s 0.177 pellets)
X10 Spring piston air rifle (305 m/s muzzle velocity 0.22 pellets / 365 m/s 0.177 pellets)
X20 Spring piston air rifle (305 m/s muzzle velocity 0.22 pellets / 365 m/s 0.177 pellets)
X50 Spring piston air rifle (360 m/s muzzle velocity 0.22 pellets / 460 m/s 0.177 pellets)
Cougar semi-automatic pistol.
Condor over-and-under shotgun.
 STF 3000 over-and-under shotgun. 
 The Grand - single shot trap shotgun
Uplander side-by-side shotgun.
Coach Gun side-by-side shotgun.
P-350 pump shotgun.
Model 2000 semi-automatic shotgun 
Model 3000 (3") semi-automatic shotgun
Model 3020 series (2.5”/3”) of 20 gauge semi-automatic shotguns
Model 3500 (3.5") semi-automatic shotgun 
Stoeger Double Defense double-barreled shotgun designed as a tactical defense gun. Black matte finish with single trigger. Has a Picatinny rail on the barrels to attach accessories.

References

External links
Stoeger Industries official website
Stoeger Books official website (archived)

Firearm importation companies of the United States
Firearm manufacturers of the United States
Book publishing companies based in Maryland
Manufacturing companies established in 1924
Beretta
1924 establishments in New York (state)